Mucilago crustacea is a species of slime mould, in the monotypic genus Mucilago, in the family Didymiaceae. Due to its visual resemblance to canine vomit, it is known colloquially as the "dog sick slime mould" or "dog sick fungus", albeit that slime moulds are not true fungi.

The fruiting body is yellow to white, becoming paler with time, and then blackening.

It usually occurs on damp grass. The species was described by P. Micheli ex F.H. Wigg.

References

Myxogastria
Amoebozoa genera
Monotypic eukaryote genera